The Verdi Peaks, officially just Verdi Peak, are a group of three mountain peaks in the Ruby Mountains of Elko County, Nevada, United States. The highest peak is the fiftieth-highest in the state. The peaks are located on the edge of the Ruby Mountains Wilderness, within the Ruby Mountains Ranger District of the Humboldt-Toiyabe National Forest. They rise from the head of Talbot Canyon above Verdi Lake, and are a prominent part of the east wall of Lamoille Canyon above the Terraces Picnic Area.

Summit panoramas

References

External links

Ruby Mountains
Mountains of Nevada
Mountains of Elko County, Nevada
Humboldt–Toiyabe National Forest